The GER Class A55 or Decapod was an experimental steam locomotive with an 0-10-0T wheel arrangement designed by James Holden for the Great Eastern Railway.  It was the first ten-coupled steam locomotive in Great Britain.

Background 

The locomotive was built for purely political purposes in order to block the passage through Parliament of a new rival scheme for an electric railway.
The Decapod was built in 1902 to a design by the GER Chief Draughtsman, Fred Russell under the supervision of the Chief Superintendent, James Holden. The aim was to demonstrate the ability of a steam locomotive to accelerate passenger trains at a rate comparable to electric traction and the electric trams with which the GER was also in competition over short distances. 

The locomotive was far larger than any locomotive previously built in Britain for home service. It had 10 driving wheels for maximum grip and prevention of wheelspin, each of which was four-foot-six-inches in diameter which gave high tractive effort.  Three cylinders were used because there was insufficient room for two cylinders large enough to develop the required tractive effort without going up to a higher boiler pressure. Even so, it still had to have a pressure of 200 psi (1,380 kPa) to achieve the required result.

Technical details 
The engine was fitted with a large Wootten firebox. As the cranks of the three cylinders were set at 120 degrees in relation to each other, perfect balancing of the reciprocating parts was secured. In order to minimise the drivers slipping, compressed air sanders were fitted.

Performance 
According to Ahrons, "Holden's engine actually accelerated a new train of eighteen coaches, weighing 335 tons, at a rate of 1.4ft. per second per second in very windy weather."

Axle load at 16.75 tons (17 tonnes) was not excessive, but weight per foot run of wheelbase was very high and using a class of these engines would have necessitated considerable strengthening of bridges. Thus whilst it achieved its design aims, nothing resulted from the experiment.

Rebuilt

As the locomotive was therefore surplus to requirements, it was rebuilt in 1906, and converted into an 0-8-0 freight tender engine. The rebuild included a new boiler with a Belpaire firebox and a standard GE high-sided goods locomotive tender.

Number 20 was then assigned to March district for hauling coal trains, but proved no more capable than the Class G58 locomotives. The design was therefore not repeated, and the locomotive remained the only eight-coupled engine of the GER.

It was scrapped in 1913 as nonstandard after a short working life.

0-10-0 developments 
The Midland Railway produced the second 0-10-0 locomotive in 1919 with its MR 0-10-0 Lickey Banker.  The third ten-coupled engine however would not appear until 1943 in the guise of a class of 2-10-0s built by the War Department, the Austerity 2-10-0. These were followed in 1954 by the last class of British ten-coupled engines, the BR Standard Class 9F.

In Fiction
In the 2017 film, Thomas & Friends: Journey Beyond Sodor, the character Hurricane is based on this engine before it was rebuilt.

References

External links 
 Mixed Traffic Locomotives Mike's Railway History

A55
0-10-0T locomotives
0-8-0 locomotives
Railway locomotives introduced in 1902
Standard gauge steam locomotives of Great Britain
Individual locomotives of Great Britain
Experimental locomotives
Scrapped locomotives
E n3t locomotives
D n2 locomotives
Freight locomotives